The 1980 United States presidential election in Texas took place on November 4, 1980. All 50 states, and the District of Columbia, were part of the 1980 United States presidential election. Texas voters chose 26 electors to the Electoral College, which selected the president and vice president of the United States.

Texas was won by Ronald Reagan of California, who was running against incumbent President Jimmy Carter of Georgia. Reagan ran with former C.I.A. Director George H. W. Bush of Texas, and Carter ran with Vice President Walter Mondale of Minnesota. Despite Texas‘ 1976 support of Carter, the state supported Reagan by a wide margin in the midst of a national landslide.

Notwithstanding Carter’s loss in Texas – which was his weakest state in the South or border states except Virginia and Oklahoma which Ford had narrowly carried in 1976 – the 1980 election is the last when the following counties have voted for a Democratic presidential candidate: Cherokee, Coke, Erath, Kaufman, Leon, Somervell, Van Zandt and Wise. As of 2020, this is the last presidential election in which Texas voted more Democratic than California.

Results

Results by county

See also
 United States presidential elections in Texas
 Presidency of Ronald Reagan

Notes

References

1980
Texas
1980 Texas elections